Dese may refer to :
Dessie, a city and a woreda in north-central Ethiopia
Centre For Electronics Design And Technology, Bangalore, India
DESE Research, a firm based in Huntsville, Alabama
 Missouri Department of Elementary and Secondary Education
 Massachusetts Department of Elementary and Secondary Education

See also
 Piombino Dese, a comune (municipality) in the Province of Padua in the Italian region Veneto